A dime a dozen is an English idiom, meaning "so common as to be practically worthless".

A Dime a Dozen or Dime a Dozen may also refer to:

Music 
 "Dime a Dozen", a song by electronic rock act Books on Tape on their album Throw Down Your Laptops
 "Dime a Dozen", a song by American country singer Shirley Collie Nelson
 "A Dime a Dozen", a song by Personalities featuring Landon Tewers of The Plot in You
 "Dime a Dozen", a song by Playaz Tryna Strive (featuring E-40) on their album All Frames of the Game
 "A Dime a Dozen", a song by American pop singer Diane Renay
 "Dime a Dozen", a song in Snoopy! The Musical
 "A Dime a Dozen", a song by American soul singer Carla Thomas
 "Dime a Dozen", a song by American singer Margaret Whiting and the Frank De Vol orchestra

Television and radio 
 "A Dime a Dozen", an episode in season 1 of the detective series Hawaiian Eye
 A Dime a Dozen, a 1952 episode of the radio anthology Stars over Hollywood starring Jan Sterling

Other 
 A Dime a Dozen, a 1998 book by American children's author Nikki Grimes
 Dime a Dozen, a 1962 revue by Julius Monk's troupe